Roger Brousse (born 13 June 1901, date of death unknown) was a French boxer. He competed in the 1924 Summer Olympics. In 1924, Brousse initially was awarded the victory on points in his quarter-final bout of the middleweight class. However, he was later disqualified for having bitten his opponent, the eventual gold medalist, Harry Mallin.

References

External links
profile

1901 births
Year of death missing
Middleweight boxers
Olympic boxers of France
Boxers at the 1924 Summer Olympics
French male boxers